"Young at Heart" is a pop standard ballad with music by Johnny Richards and lyrics by Carolyn Leigh.

Development and first release
The song was written and published in 1953, with Leigh contributing the lyrics to what was originally a Richards instrumental called "Moonbeam". Frank Sinatra was the first performer to record the song, which became a million-selling hit in late 1953 (and spilling over with popularity into 1954) where it reached the No. 2 spot in the Billboard chart.

The song was such a hit that a movie Sinatra was filming at the same time with Doris Day was renamed to match the song title, and the song was included in the opening and closing credits of the movie.

Recordings
Although  Frank Sinatra was the first performer to record the song, many other performers who have recorded versions of "Young at Heart" include
 Bing Crosby (charting briefly in 1954 at the number 24 spot),
 Rosemary Clooney (on her album While We're Young),
 Perry Como (on his 1960 album For the Young at Heart)
 Connie Francis (1961)
 Jimmy Durante (1963) 
 Tony Bennett 
 Shawn Colvin 
 Val Doonican
 Bobby Vinton 
 Tom Waits 
 Barry Manilow (on his album The Greatest Songs of the Fifties) 
 Bob Dylan 
 Gloria Estefan 
 Landon Pigg 
 Mark Vincent and Vonda Shepard 
 James Darren 
 Monty Alexander 
 Michael Bublé (on his album To Be Loved)
 Willie Nelson (on his 2018 album My Way)
 Donald Duck (Tony Anselmo)

On the 1988 TV Special, Magic in the Magic Kingdom, George Burns sang "Young at Heart" during a musical break.  In 2016, at age 90, Dick Van Dyke recorded a duet with his wife, Arlene, at Capitol Records Studio in Los Angeles, filmed for the HBO special on aging If You're Not in the Obit, Eat Breakfast, starring Carl Reiner and featuring Mel Brooks, Norman Lear, Stan Lee, Betty White and others over 90 years old. Van Dyke was recorded using Frank Sinatra's microphone.

Wild Man Fischer recorded an eccentric version that was included on The Rhino Brothers Present the World's Worst Records.

The song has also been used on the soundtracks of other films, including 
 The Front (1976), 
 Sweet Dreams (1985),
 City Slickers (1991) (Jimmy Durante version), 
 It Could Happen to You (1994), 
 Space Cowboys (2000) (in a rendition by Willie Nelson)
 2016 Summer Olympics featurette from Gatorade

The Cure incorporated verses from "Young at Heart" during concert performances of "Why Can't I Be You?" (widely available on bootlegs).

References

1953 singles
Frank Sinatra songs
Perry Como songs
Tony Bennett songs
Bing Crosby songs
Rosemary Clooney songs
Connie Francis songs
Tom Waits songs
Songs with lyrics by Carolyn Leigh
1953 songs
Songs about old age
Pop standards
Jazz standards